The Moody Shattuck House is a historic house at 768 Main Street in Worcester, Massachusetts.  The Queen Anne style house was constructed in 1885 and added to the National Register of Historic Places in 1980.

Moody Edson Shattuck, founder of the M.E. Shattuck Cigar & Tobacco Company, was born in Waterville, Vermont on May 9, 1835. In 1858 he arrived in Worcester, Massachusetts and purchased a cigar store in the Lincoln House block, moving to the Walker Building two years later. Over the next several decades he would continue to develop his cigar business. At one time, it was one of the largest in New England.

Moody Shattuck married Helen Augusta Prouty on January 12, 1863. He built the house at 768 Main Street in 1885. Moody Shattuck died April 10, 1892. His wife remained in the house after his death. Mrs. Shattuck died in 1907. Both are buried at the Worcester Rural Cemetery.

See also
National Register of Historic Places listings in southwestern Worcester, Massachusetts
National Register of Historic Places listings in Worcester County, Massachusetts

References

Houses in Worcester, Massachusetts
Queen Anne architecture in Massachusetts
Houses completed in 1885
National Register of Historic Places in Worcester, Massachusetts
Houses on the National Register of Historic Places in Worcester County, Massachusetts